Global Oriental is an imprint of the Dutch publishing house Brill. It used to be trade publishing company based in Kent, United Kingdom. It is the publisher of scholarly books on Japan and East Asia in fields such as History, Martial Arts, Arts and Literature. In April 2010 it was acquired by Brill publishers of Leiden, The Netherlands.

Inner Asia Journal
In 2005, Global Oriental formally took over publication of Inner Asia, the journal of the Mongolia and Inner Asia Studies Unit (MIASU) at the University of Cambridge.

MIASU was founded in 1986 as a group within the Department of Social Anthropology to promote research and teaching relating to Mongolia and Inner Asia on an inter-disciplinary basis. The unit aims to promote and encourage study of this important region and to provide training and support for research to all those concerned with its understanding.  MIASU is currently one of the very few research-oriented forums in the world in which scholars can address the contemporary and historical problems of the region. The unit is also concerned with how "Inner Asia" as an object of study is being reconfigured, from the late-nineteenth century discourse of orientalism to contemporary critical studies of economic and cultural transformation.

Inner Asia is published twice yearly and edited by the MIASU's principal scholars, Caroline Humphrey, David Sneath and Uradyn E. Bulag.

Specialized subjects

 Inner Asia Journal
 Anthropology
 Arts
 China - General Reference
 Comparative & Cross Cultural Studies
 Education
 Environment
 Gender Studies
 Geography
 Health
 History
 Inner Asia
 Korea – General Reference
 Lafcadio Hearn Studies
 Languages of Asia
 Literature
 Martial Arts
 Media & Cultural Studies
 Memoir & Biography
 Military History
 Mongolia
 Philosophy
 Politics & Economics
 Psychology
 Rediscovering Series
 Religion
 Science & Technology
 Sociology
 Transport
 Travel
 20th Century Japanese Writers Series

References

External links
  Official website

Book publishing companies of the United Kingdom